Patrick Beurard-Valdoye, (born 1955) is a French poet from Paris. He is also an art critic.

Biography
A childhood spent in the Belfort region, gave Beurard-Valdoye exposure to German language and culture, including local dialects often associated with geography and local water courses and their various names. The proximity of the Swiss border enabled repeated visits to the Basel Kunstmuseum which made a lasting impact as did a visit early in his life to Le Corbusier's Chapelle Notre Dame du Haut.

During his studies at the University of Strasbourg in the early 1970s he discovered Dada art, especially work by Hans Arp and Sophie Taeuber-Arp. In 1980, he moved to Lyon where was co-founder of an arts magazine, Cahiers de leçons de choses. Simultaneously he was a contributor to the journal Opus international, and became involved in curating exhibitions and writing catalogues of post-war German artists. He founded and directed a readings serie from 1983 to 2000 (about 400 poets invited).

Patrick Beurard-Valdoye is professor of creative writing in the l’École nationale supérieure des beaux-arts de Lyon.

He attributes his career inspiration to a stay in Cork, Ireland in 1974. 
 noting that writing puts me together again, I believe naively perhaps, and with a touch of arrogance, that it could help others as well. My chosen road is that. One day I shall be a poet. I would add two things: I mean poet, as opposed to a writer, and from the off. It probably comes from the German conception where people such as Goethe, Robert Musil, Thomas Mann and Günter Grass are considered Dichter; but also from the Irish concept where Joyce is so feted as a bard that his likeness appeared on banknotes. A poet is not confined to verse. He is an artist whose medium is writing, availing himself of all forms except dead ones. Anyway, one day I shall be a poet. Future tense. It will be work as much as a struggle.
He translated the poet Hilda Morley into French (magazine Action poétique, n ° 204).

Poetic style 
His major project is primarily focused on a series entitled, "cycle des exils", an epic, composed so far of seven published volumes. His style is to emphasise the similarity between significant historical events that are chronologically separated, as it were a recurrent polyphony that challenges traditional linear ways of presenting history. The poem, "the saga" progresses by gathering together references to oral history, anecdotes and authorised versions. His influences have included Kurt Schwitters, Ghérasim Luca, Oskar Pastior Bernard Heidsieck and the all but forgotten Jean-Paul de Dadelsen.

Several films of his performances are on vimeo.com https://vimeo.com/233185909, https://vimeo.com/190642937.

Works

Le Cycle des exils
Allemandes, MEM / Arte Facts, 1985
Diaire, Al Dante, 2000
Mossa, Léo Scheer / Al Dante, 2002
La fugue inachevée, Léo Scheer / Al Dante, 2004
Le narré des îles Schwitters, New Al Dante, 2007
Gadjo-Migrandt, Flammarion, 2014
Flache d’Europe aimants garde-fous, Flammarion 2019,

Other publications
Le cours des choses, 26 poèmes-fleuves pour un EuropA.B.C., drawings by Pierre Alechinsky MEM / Arte Facts, 1989
Etreinte, La main courante, 1990
Couleurre, éditions du Limon, 1993
Vanité que de l'écrire, etchings by Germain Roesz, Lieux-dits, 1994
Les noms perdus, des sources aux pertes de la Meuse, drawings by Isabelle Vorle, La main courante, 1996
Les noms propres des couleurs, Tarabuste, 1996
Le verbe de Luca, dossier Gherasim Luca, revue JAVA, numéro 15, 1996
Lire page région, Tarabuste, 1998
N'imite jamais le cri du héron, with artistic input from Isabelle Vorle, rencontres, 1998
Flux, CD audio SON@RT, 2002
Le secret des limbes intercepté, Carnets de Montagne froide, 2003
Der Sprachenhausierer, Ithaka verlag, 2003
Itinerrance, sites cités citains, Obsidiane, 2004
Théorie des noms Textuel, coll. "l'œil du poète", 2006
L'Europe en capsaille, Maison de la poésie de Rennes / Al Dante, 2006
Schwitters du Nord à la mort, CD audio Hôtel Beury, 2006
Notre étrange prison, L'arbre à paroles, coll. « Résidences », 2007
L'asconaute dans l'atelier de la natur, in Art is Arp Musée d'art moderne et contemporain of Strasbourg, 2008
Le messager d'Aphrodite, Obsidiane, 2009
Kurt Schwitters et les arts poétiques, with Isabelle Ewig, "traductions inédites", revue Action poétique, no. 202, 2010
Le vocaluscrit, Lanskine, 2017
Le purgatoire irlandé d'Artaud, Au coin de la rue de l'enfer, 2020

References

Bibliography
 Revue Il particolare, 17/18, 2007
 Revue Faire-Part, 25, 2009

External links
 Bibliographie complète publications on art criticism by Patrick Beurard-Valdoye
 Poezibao (interviews with Florence Trocmé): 
 Sitaudis, (links to texts by/about Beurard-Valdoye) : 
 Hapax (idem): 
 Editions Al Dante (page about the author) : 
 YouTube (some extracts from his recitals): 
 Archives de la critique d'art: 

20th-century French male writers
20th-century French poets
21st-century French poets
21st-century French male writers
French male poets
Living people
1955 births
Writers from Paris
French art critics
Writers from Belfort
University of Strasbourg alumni
French magazine founders